The Man in the Saddle is a 1945 German film directed by and starring Harry Piel.

The film's sets were designed by the art director Gabriel Pellon.

The film was previously thought to have been lost since 1945. However, in the 1990s, the film was found in an East German archive and had a premiere in 2000 in Berlin.

Cast
In alphabetical order
 Valy Arnheim as Ganove
 Ellen Bang as Steffi
 Paul Bildt as Kommissar Hentschke
 Eduard Bornträger
 Egon Brosig
 Charlott Daudert as Ossi la Planta
 Erich Dunskus
 Herbert Gernot as Kommissar
 Otto Graf as Fritz Thermälen
 Walter Gross as Arzt
 Kurt Hagen
 Clemens Hasse as Otto Bruck
 Karl Hellmer as Wilhelm
 Irmgard Krohn
 Alwin Lippisch
 Edgar Pauly
 Harry Piel as Trainer Roberts
 Karl Platen as Gastwirt
 Josef Reithofer
 Walter Ruesta
 Just Scheu
 Kurt Seifert as Paul, Futtermeister
 Ute Sielisch
 Michael von Newlinsky
 Genia von Unruh
 Elsa Wagner as Haushälterin
 Karl Wagner
 Aruth Wartan as Trunkenbold
 Gerhild Weber as Lisa Freyberg
 Ewald Wenck as Zeuge
 Paul Westermeier as Reinhold Schirmer
 Peter Widmann as Nicco Jersonf
 Anneliese Würtz
 Hans Zesch-Ballot as Dr. Gustl Gallinger

See also
 Überläufer
 The Man in the Saddle (1925)

References

Bibliography 
 Rentschler, Eric. The Ministry of Illusion: Nazi Cinema and Its Afterlife. Harvard University Press, 1996.

External links 
 

1945 films
1940s German-language films
Films directed by Harry Piel
German black-and-white films
Remakes of German films
German horse racing films
Sound film remakes of silent films
Tobis Film films
1940s rediscovered films
Rediscovered German films
1940s German films